Haranpur Junction railway station is  located in Pakistan. The station is 9 km from Malakwal Junction railway station.

See also
 List of railway stations in Pakistan
 Pakistan Railways

References

External links

Railway stations in Jhelum District
Railway stations on Malakwal–Khushab branch line